Chandannagar Assembly constituency is an assembly constituency in Hooghly district in the Indian state of West Bengal.

Overview
As per orders of the Delimitation Commission, No. 189 Chandanagar Assembly constituency is composed of the following: Chandernagore Municipal Corporation and Bhadreswar Municipality.

Chandannagar Assembly constituency is part of No. 28 Hooghly (Lok Sabha constituency).

Members of Legislative Assembly

Election results

2021

2011

  

 

.# Swing calculated on Congress+Trinamool Congress vote percentages taken together in 2006.

1977-2006
In the 2006 state assembly elections Sibaprosad Bandopadhyay of CPI(M) won the 182 Chandernagore assembly seat defeating his nearest rival Ram Chakraborty of Trinamool Congress. Contests in most years were multi cornered but only winners and runners are being mentioned. Kamal Mukherjee of Congress defeated Ratan Lal Dasgupta of CPI(M) in 2001 and Sandhya Chattopadhyay of CPI(M) in 1996. Sandhya Chattopadhyay of CPI(M) defeated Kamal Mukherjee of Congress in 1991 and 1987. Bhabani Mukherjee of CPI(M) defeated Indumati Bhattacharya of Congress in 1982 and Asit Mukhopadhyay of Congress in 1977.

1957-1972
Bhabani Mukherjee of CPI(M) won in 1972, 1971, 1969 and 1967. Bhabani Mukherjee of CPI won in 1962. Hirendra Kumar Chattopadhyay, Independent, won in 1957.

1951-1962 Bhadreswar
The Bhadreswar seat was there between 1951 and 1962.  Girija Bhushan Mukhopadhyay of CPI won in 1962. Byomkesh Majumdar of Congress won in 1957 and in independent India's first election in 1951.

References

Assembly constituencies of West Bengal
Politics of Hooghly district
Chandannagar